The Shumen dialect is a Bulgarian dialect, member of the Moesian dialects. It is one of the best preserved Moesian dialects and is spoken in the regions of Shumen and Kaspichan.

Phonological and morphological characteristics
 The reflex of Old Church Slavonic ѣ in a stressed syllable is я before a hard syllable (бл) and broad е before a soft syllable (бли). In an unstressed syllable, the reflex is, however, only я: врме'на vs. formal Bulgarian време'на (times)
 Complete loss of x  in all positions. It is replaced by either f or v: фулера vs. formal Bulgarian холера (cholera)
 The masculine definite article is о (stressed) and у (unstressed) instead of formal Bulgarian –ът/ъ (гърˈбо, ˈстолу instead of гърˈбът, ˈстолът)
 Preserved traces of Old Bulgarian ы : сын vs. formal Bulgarian син (son).
 Transition of a into e after a soft (palatal) consonant and before a soft syllable: шапка-шепки vs. Standard Bulgarian шапка-шапки (hat-hats)
 Large number of o reflexes of Old Church Slavonic ъ in a suffix position (as in the Southwestern Bulgarian dialects) and subsequent reduction of o into у: напредук vs. Standard Bulgarian напредък (progress)
 Labialisation of и into ʲу: пʲупер vs. Standard Bulgarian пипер (pepper)
 Elision of syllables, vowels and consonants, usually in frequently used words: рапта vs. Standard Bulgarian работа (work)
 A large number of lexical peculiarities, e.g. жерка vs. common Bulgarian воденица (watermill)

For other phonological and morphological characteristics that are typical for all Moesian dialects, cf. article.

Sources
Стойков, Стойко: Българска диалектология, Акад. изд. "Проф. Марин Дринов", 2006, с. 105-106

Dialects of the Bulgarian language

Culture in Shumen